La Sapienza is French-Italian dramatic film by Eugène Green released in 2015.

The film derives its title from Sant'Ivo alla Sapienza — a Catholic church built in Rome in 1642–1660 by architect Francesco Borromini, widely considered a masterpiece of Roman Baroque architecture.

Synopsis

Alexandre a renowned architect after receiving a prestigious award, along with his wife Alienor journeys to Italy, with the intention of producing a book on Borromini. Alienor meanwhile feels that her relationship with Alexandre is gradually slipping away. Along the way the two befriend a brother and sister, Goffredo and Lavinia. Goffredo is about to embark on a course of architectural studies and joins Alexandre on trip to Turin and Rome to survey Borromini's great works.

It is a story of the rediscovery of the joys of life and overcoming of anxieties. Therein Alexandre realizes that Borromini was searching for the light which he must bring back into his life both to rekindle his architectural practice and his marriage to his wife.

Cast
 Fabrizio Rongione as Alexandre Schmidt
 Christelle Prot Landman as Aliénor Schmidt
 Ludovico Succio as Goffredo
 Arianna Nastro as Lavinia
 Hervé Compagne as Ministre
 Sabine Ponte as Isabelle
 Eugène Green	 as a Chaldean

References

External links
 
 Film trailer - 

2014 films
French drama films
Italian drama films
Films about architecture
2014 drama films
2010s French films